Bekal a town in Kerala, India. 

Bekal may also refer to:
Bekal Fort, the largest fort in Kerala
Bekal Fort railway station
Bekal (name)